Gerard John Werder (August 1, 1894 – April 11, 1942) was an American Football Offensive Tackle for 2 seasons in 1920 and 1921. He played for the Buffalo All-Americans in 1920 and the Tonawanda Kardex in 1921. In his career he played 5 games, 4 for Buffalo, 1 for Tonawanda. Werder went to college at Dayton. He died on April 4, 1942.

References

1894 births
1942 deaths
Buffalo All-Americans players
Tonawanda Kardex players
Players of American football from Pennsylvania